LEDA 74886, also known by its 2MASX designation 2MASX J03404323-1838431, and sometimes known as the Emerald-cut Galaxy, is a dwarf galaxy with a rare rectangular shape. The galaxy was detected in a wide field of view image taken by the Subaru Telescope using the Subaru Prime Focus Camera (Suprime-Cam). Using the Keck Telescope, a thin disc with a side on orientation was confirmed to be lurking at the center of LEDA 74886, and spinning at a speed of 33 km/s at the orbital radius of half a kpc. LEDA 74886 has a mass of around 109 M☉ (Compared to the Milky Way's mass of about 1012 M☉).

Location
It is located within the Galactic corona of NGC 1407, a massive spherical galaxy which is located approximately 163,000 ly (50 kpc) to the northwest of LEDA 74886.

See also
SDSS J074018.17+282756.3 is a spiral galaxy with arms that have a somewhat squarish-looking interior, but is distinct from LEDA 74886 because LEDA 74886 has no apparent spiral structure and a boxy like exterior form.
Sextans A, a member of the local group, has a box like form due to its expanding shell of young blue stars, but it has a much lower mass and density, and includes a central disc which LEDA 74886 does not include.
 NGC 4488

References

Eridanus (constellation)
Lenticular galaxies
074886